The House of Assembly, or Lower House, is one of the two chambers of the Parliament of Tasmania in Australia. The other is the Legislative Council or Upper House. It sits in Parliament House in the state capital, Hobart.

The Assembly has 25 members, elected for a term of up to four years, with five members being elected in each of five electorates, called divisions. Each division has approximately the same number of electors. Voting for the House of Assembly is by a form of proportional representation using the single transferable vote (STV), known as the Hare-Clark electoral system. By having multiple members for each division, the voting intentions of the electors are more closely represented in the House of Assembly.

Since 1998, the quota for election in each division, after distribution of preferences, has been 16.7% (one-sixth). Under the preferential proportional voting system in place, the lowest-polling candidates are eliminated, and their votes distributed as preferences to the remaining candidates. If a candidate achieves a quota, they are declared elected and any surplus votes (those over and above quota) are redistributed according to the next back-up preference marked by the voter.

This system not only makes it all but certain that the division's minority party wins at least one seat, but makes it easier for minor parties to enter the legislature and possibly exert influence through the balance of power (the need for a working majority in the assembly). In the present House of Assembly, winning 15 seats—only two more than necessary for a majority—is considered a landslide victory. The last election for the House of Assembly took place on 1 May 2021.

Most legislation is initiated in the House of Assembly. The party or coalition with a majority of seats in the House of Assembly is invited by the Governor of Tasmania to form Government. The leader of that party becomes the Premier of Tasmania, and their senior colleagues become ministers responsible for various portfolios. As Australian politicians traditionally vote along party lines, most legislation introduced by the governing party will be passed by the House of Assembly.

Unlike other Australian state legislatures, the House of Assembly is elected from multimember districts while the Legislative Council is elected from single-member districts. The reverse is the case in most of the rest of Australia; that is, the lower house is elected from single-member districts while the upper house is elected from multi-member districts or at large.

History

The House of Assembly was first established in 1856, under legislation passed by the British Parliament creating the independent self-governing Colony of Tasmania.  The Legislative Council had already existed since 1852. The first elections for the House of Assembly were held in October 1856. The House first met on 2 December 1856 in the area that is now the parliamentary members lounge. The first House had members elected to represent 24 electorates.  Hobart had five members, Launceston had three members, and the 22 other electorates each had one member.

In 1906 the old electoral system was abolished.  Instead, the state was divided into five equally represented multi-member electorates corresponding to the state's five federal electorates. Each electorate would return six members using the Hare-Clark proportional representation system.

In 1959 the number of members per electorate was increased to seven. In 1998 it was reduced to five, resulting in the current 25-member parliament. The reduction has been criticised by the Greens, as an attempt to reduce their influence. In 2010, the leaders of the three main parties—Labor, the Liberals and the Greens—moved to increase the number of seats in the House back to 35 for the next state election. The three leaders signed an agreement on 2 September to submit the proposal for public consideration before taking a set of resolutions to their respective party rooms. The proposal, however, was dropped in February 2011 when the Liberal Party withdrew its support for the plan, citing budget circumstances.

In 2022 the House of Assembly returned to seven-seat districts with the Expansion of Assembly Act 2022.

Unlike most state parliaments in Australia, by-elections are very rare in the House of Assembly.  Since 1917, casual vacancies have usually been filled by a simple recount of votes. One of the few by-elections in recent memory occurred in 1980, when the Supreme Court ordered a new election in Denison because three Labor members had exceeded spending limits.

Electorates

With five members each, the five electoral divisions of the Tasmanian House of Assembly are:

Bass
Braddon
Clark
Franklin
Lyons

The electorates of the Tasmanian House of Assembly have the same boundaries and names as the electorates for the federal House of Representatives.

Members

Current distribution of seats
The distribution of seats as a result of the 2021 House of Assembly elections was:

The current distribution of seats is:

See also

Parliaments of the Australian states and territories
List of Tasmanian House of Assembly casual vacancies

Notes

References

External links
 Tasmanian Electoral Commission - House of Assembly
 Tasmanian Parliament Website
 List of members of the Tasmanian House of Assembly
 Tasmania Parliament History

 
Parliament of Tasmania
Tasmania
1856 establishments in Australia